Louis Ferrante (born May 13, 1969) is a former Gambino crime family mobster, who spent eight and a half years in prison, successfully appealed his conviction and became a bestselling true crime, business, and science writer. He hosts his own show, airing on Discovery International in 195 countries and was nominated for a Grierson Trust Award, which is considered the most prestigious documentary award in the United Kingdom, known as "the Oscars of the documentary world."

On September 15, 2011, Ferrante spoke at The Economist's Ideas Economy: Human Potential Summit in New York City. On October 21, 2014, Ferrante spoke at the CEO Global Leaders Forum in New York City, hosted by billionaire businessman Leonard Lauder.

Early life
Ferrante was born on May 13, 1969 in Queens, New York, where he was raised. As a teenager, he made his reputation as a gang leader. Ferrante and his gang hijacked delivery trucks all over New York and he soon gained the attention of the Gambino crime family. By his early twenties, Ferrante headed a crew of older armed robbers within the family. Newspaper articles from the 1990s referred to Ferrante as "John Gotti's pal". Another article referred to Ferrante as a "crony of John A. Gotti." On one occasion, Ferrante and his crew flew from New York to California to hold up an armored car. His plans were foiled by the FBI, although there was insufficient evidence to charge Ferrante and his crew with a crime. Around this time, he was suspected of masterminding some of the largest heists in U.S. history.

Arrests

Ferrante was targeted by many investigations. He was eventually indicted by the FBI, the United States Secret Service, and the Nassau County Organized Crime Task Force.

The main witness against Ferrante entered the Witness Protection program. Another informant against Ferrante was William Degel, now the host of Restaurant Stakeout on Food Network. By 1994, and facing a life sentence in prison, Ferrante wrote and distributed a rap song defending crime boss John Gotti. Ferrante hired controversial civil rights attorney William Kunstler to defend him. During the trial, Kunstler claimed that Ferrante's song aggravated law enforcement agencies who had convicted Gotti and that the massive resources used to indict Ferrante multiple times were part of a government vendetta. Ferrante's defense was defeated in court by prosecutors and Ferrante was convicted. In Ferrante's second case, he chose to plead guilty to a thirteen-year sentence, with his third case running concurrent with the first two cases. Ferrante refused to cooperate with the government and did not inform on former associates of the Gambino family.  He was sent to the maximum security prison in Lewisburg, Pennsylvania to begin his sentence.

Prison
Ferrante has stated he read his first book and became interested in writing during his incarnation at the Lewisburg Penitentiary.  He subsequently immersed himself in the study of history, philosophy, and literature. He also penned a historical novel, Aleesa, set in the antebellum South. Lewisburg Penitentiary was the site of numerous violent race wars, resulting in many violent deaths. In his memoir Unlocked, Ferrante cites his need to shield his mind from the racism around him as the main motivation to write books.

While in prison, Ferrante hired and fired a number of attorneys before successfully appealing his own conviction, a case that is cited in courtrooms across the country. He was released in January 2003, after serving eight and a half years. In addition to law, Ferrante, a former Catholic, studied many religions and chose to convert to Judaism. becoming an observant Jew.

Books and other writings
In the United States, the paperback edition of Ferrante's memoir is titled Unlocked: The Life and Crimes of a Mafia Insider.  In the United Kingdom, the memoir is titled Tough Guy: The Life and Crimes of a Mafia Insider. The book has also been translated to Dutch.

Ferrante's second book is titled Mob Rules and is a non-fiction business book. The book was shortlisted for the 800-CEO-Read Awards and is an international bestseller. It has been translated to more than 20 languages.

Ferrante's third book is titled The Three Pound Crystal Ball: How the Dreaming Brain Can See the Future. It combines physics, psychology, personal experience, extensive research, and neuroscience to establish that the dreaming brain can see nanoseconds into the future. Ferrante conceived this theory while at prison, but developed it after his release. A number of professional scientists have praised the book which follows the lives of Albert Einstein and Sigmund Freud as the work of both men contributed to Ferrante's theory.

Ferrante has also contributed essays to Signed, Your Student: Celebrities Praise the Teachers Who Made Them Who They Are Today, and Bound to Last: 30 Writers on Their Most Cherished Book.

The book, Philosophy for Life and Other Dangerous Situations, by Jules Evans, contains a chapter dedicated to Ferrante titled, "Plutarch and the Art of Heroism."

United Kingdom
Ferrante has visited numerous United Kingdom prisons in an effort to help British prison inmates. As a result of his voluntary work, he received the Celebrity Reading Hero Award. He has been a guest on numerous BBC radio and television programs and has appeared as a guest on the world-renowned news program BBC HARDTalk. Ferrante was also nominated for the Grierson Trust Award, which is considered by many the United Kingdom's most prestigious documentary award; the list of nominees includes David Attenborough.

Television

Ferrante is an award-nominated television host, who also works behind the camera. He is co-creator and executive producer for the television series, The Diamond Collar which aired on Oprah Winfrey's OWN Network on early 2014. Ferrante appeared with actors Al Pacino and James Caan and with director Francis Ford Coppola in the anniversary documentary, The Godfather Legacy.

Inside the Gangsters' Code

Ferrante's television series, Inside the Gangsters' Code premiered on February 27, 2013. Each hour-long episode follows Ferrante as he explores different gang cultures around the world. Inside the Gangsters' Code aired on Discovery Channel in over 195 countries and in multiple languages. Ferrante wrote, hosted, narrated, and co-produced the series.

The Philippines

The 2013 episode "The Commandos" which exposed the luxurious prison cells owned by gang leaders controlling the Philippines' largest maximum security prison became the subject of a drug trafficking and bribery scandal and investigation at the House of Representatives of the Philippines.

Philippine President Rodrigo Duterte used the episode as a propaganda tool to gain and maintain power in the country. Time Magazine's World Desk interviewed Ferrante and covered the story on August 10, 2017.

Awards and nominations
Ferrante received the U.K. Celebrity Reading Hero Award, which was presented to him by Sarah Brown, wife of British Prime Minister Gordon Brown, in 2009.

Ferrante's second book Mob Rules was a 1-800-CEO-READ 2011 Business Book Award nominee, and was one of Forbes magazine columnist Marc Kramer's World's Best Business Books.

In 2013, Ferrante made the final shortlist of nominees for the Grierson Trust Documentary Television Awards in the United Kingdom. Ferrante was nominated for Documentary Presenter of the Year for his show Inside the Gangsters' Code.

Bibliography
Ferrante, Louis (2011). Mob Rules: What the Mafia Can Teach the Legitimate Businessman. .
Ferrante, Louis (2015). The Three Pound Crystal Ball: How the Dreaming Brain Can See the Future. .
Ferrante, Louis (2009). Unlocked: The Life and Crimes of a Mafia Insider. .
Holbert, Holly M., editor. (2010). Signed, Your Student: Celebrities Praise the Teachers Who Made Them Who They Are Today. .
Langum, David J. (1999). William M. Kunstler: The Most Hated Lawyer in America. .
Manning, Sean, editor (2010). Bound to Last: 30 Writers on Their Most Cherished Book. .

Radio Interviews
The Bob Edwards Show (23 February 2009)
The Leonard Lopate Show: "Mafia Soldier Converts to Orthodox Judaism" (26 March 2008)

References

External links
 Exclusive! Interview with Ex.Mafia Gangster – Louis Ferrante.
 Louis Ferrante Official Website
 Discovery Channel: Inside the Gangsters' Code

1969 births
Gambino crime family
Converts to Judaism
American gangsters of Italian descent
American writers of Italian descent
American non-fiction writers
20th-century American Jews
Living people
American non-fiction crime writers
American crime writers
21st-century American Jews